The Kyrenia Ship is the wreck of a 4th-century BC ancient Greek merchant ship. It was discovered by Greek-Cypriot diving instructor Andreas Cariolou in November 1965 during a storm. Having lost the exact position, Cariolou carried out more than 200 dives until he re-discovered the wreck in 1967 close to Kyrenia in Cyprus. Michael Katzev, a graduate student at the University of Pennsylvania Museum of Archaeology and Anthropology, directed a scientific excavation from 1967–69. Preservation of the ship's timbers continued during the winter of 1970. Katzev later was a co-founder of the Institute of Nautical Archaeology. The find was extensively covered in a documentary by the Cyprus Broadcasting Corporation titled "With Captain, Sailors Three: The Ancient Ship of Kyrenia"]. The ship itself was very well preserved with approximately 75% of its hull in good condition. It found a new home at the Ancient Shipwreck Museum in Kyrenia Castle, where it remains on exhibit.

Career
The ship sailed in the Mediterranean during the lifetime of Alexander the Great and his successors. She sank in open waters less than a mile from the ancient harbor of Kyrenia. The evidence points to her being taken by rough seas around the year 300 BC, when she was rather old, though piracy is a distinct possibility.

Archaeologists found spear points in the hull. While these could very well be used for the protection of the crew, rubber casts indicate that some were in contact with the lead sheathing covering the ship. This would suggest that the points were stuck inside the hull when it sank - possible evidence of an attack. In typical merchant ships the captain would have a balance, weights, and coinage for measuring and trading goods- all of which were missing. Even more surprising is that over a ton of cargo is absent from the wreckage. This leads researchers to believe that the ship could have been plundered. What opens up this argument further is the presence of an uninscribed curse tablet in the wreckage.In this scenario a pirate would hammer the lead tablet to a part of the boat in hopes that gods of the underworld would drag the ship to the seabed and hold it there to conceal the evidence of the crime. This tablet, along with the missing equipment leads many to believe that piracy played a part in the vessel's sinking.

The ship was in use by merchants for 15–25 years. Knowing that the ship was old, archaeologists could use the repairs on the hull to better understand classical carpentry.  A break in the ship's keel had been mended, and the outside of the ship was protected with pitch and lead sheathing to keep the aging timbers water-tight and extend the ship's working life..  Closer analysis of the rabbets in the hull's frame suggest that the mast step had been moved up to three, and possibly four times. This movement happens to be in close proximity with a space to collect bilge water. Because of this, archaeologists surmise that the movement of the mast step was to make way for a larger bilge bucket, capable of lifting water out and overboard These extreme measures to deal with water infiltration corroborate the frailty of the ship and may have contributed to its sinking. The hull's near-complete preservation, along with its extensive repairs, demonstrate its long sailing life and adds greatly to our knowledge of ship building in antiquity.

Discovery

The shipwreck of Kyrenia (Keryneia) was discovered in November 1965 by the Kyrenian Greek Cypriot diving instructor and Municipal Councilor  Andreas Cariolou while collecting sponges at a sea depth of 33 metres, approximately a nautical mile Northeast of the harbour of Kyrenia on the North coast of the Republic of Cyprus, during a stormy day. With the storm at the surface the anchor of his vessel started to drag on the muddy seabed.  Cariolou noticed the cloud of the drag and followed the anchor's slow travel when he suddenly noticed the shipwreck. Happily bewildered he had to quickly recover and  follow the drag of his anchor as his vessel was dangerously approaching the rocky coast. Understanding the importance of his finding and the danger of illegal excavations, he remained discreet about it informing only the director of the Department of Antiquities Dr. Vasos Karagiorgis and the President of the Republic of Cyprus. In late 1967, the Department of Antiquities of the Republic of Cyprus,  invited a number of Underwater Archaeologists to study the possibilities of excavating at such a  particularly difficult and costly sea depth. Amongst them was nautical archaeologist Michael Katzev of the University of Pennsylvania Museum of Archaeology and Anthropology who was working at the time on a survey of the coast of Cyprus for shipwrecks. In that year, Andreas Cariolou took the team headed by Michael Katzev  to the site.

First, a team of scientists from Oxford University (Dr. Edward Hall, Dr. Jeremy Green), using a "proton" magnetometer metal detector and probes, spent a month surveying the site to find metal parts and the approximate position of the entire ship and her cargo over an area measuring approximately 20 metres by 5 metres. During the summers of 1968 and 1969 , Michael Katzev directed the expedition consisting of more than 50 underwater archaeologists, students and technicians employing stereo-photography and other developed techniques to record the position of each object before it was brought to surface. Then the ship's wooden  hull which was well preserved in the silt and muddy seabed  was "mapped", labeled and carefully lifted in a number of pieces to the surface.

Archaeological evidence

The objects in Kyrenia Castle are the original ones that she carried during her last voyage about 2300 years ago. From them we can learn about the life of the captain and three sailors who manned the ship. More than 400 wine amphoras, mostly made in Rhodes, constitute the main cargo and they indicate that the ship made an important stop at that island, possibly its home port.

Ten distinct amphora shapes on board suggest other ports of call, such as Samos in the north. Another cargo of the ship was perfectly preserved almonds, 9000 in number, that were found in jars and also within the ship's hull. Twenty-nine millstones, laden in three rows over the keel as cargo also served as ballast. At the stone quarry, probably on the island of Kos, masons carved letters of identification on the sides of these stones. All these bits of evidence suggest that the ship sailed southwards along the coast of Anatolia, calling at Samos, Kos and Rhodes before continuing eastwards to her destruction off Cyprus.

The sailors fished during the voyage and this is revealed by more than 300 lead net weights found in the bow. Meals were probably prepared ashore, using large casserole pots and a bronze cauldron. Four wooden spoons, four oil jugs, four salt dishes and four drinking cups recovered in the shipwreck suggest that her crew on her last voyage consisted of four seamen.

The ship's single sail may have been taken down before she sank as the stern cabin contained more than 100 lead rigging rings from a large square sail stowed there. The wooden[hull , built mostly of  pine (Pinus brutia), was preserved for a length of almost 14.7 metres  by 4.4 metres across. The ship was built  using the "shell first" ancient method, the opposite of today's method. Contrary to the contemporary wood boat building method where a complete skeleton of frames of the entire vessel must first be constructed, in this case, the planking from the keel and up  was joined together first, using a mortice-and-tenon construction, and then the frames were laid in,  secured with an ingenious assembly of wood pegs pierced by copper nails passing through both frames and planks. The ship was intended for long service and underwent four major repairs in her life. In the last repair a skin of lead sheathing of 1.5 to 2 millimeters thickness was applied to her body to hopefully keep the old ship comparatively safe from woodworm and probably help watertightness. Carbon 14 dating of the ship's planks gives a date of 389 BC (plus or minus 44 years). Carbon 14 dating of the almonds points to a date of 288 BC (plus or minus 62 years). Hence the ship was very old the day she sank.

Preservation and conservation of the ship's wood began in 1970 and lasted four years until the original timbers were reassembled on permanent scaffolding, to be seen still today on exhibit, along with its cargoes and goods of the sailors in Kyrenia Castle.

Replicas

Kyrenia II
In 1985, the President and founder of the Hellenic Institute for the Preservation of Nautical Tradition (HIPNT) Harry Tzalas in close cooperation with Dr. Michael Katzev and ancient ship re-constructor Richard Steffy with a number of Greek experts on traditional boat building and underwater archaeology, completed a full-size replica of the ship, known as Kyrenia II. The ship was constructed following an exact procedure as the one followed by the ancient boatbuilder of the ancient ship of Kyrenia. This was achieved at the Manolis Psaros boatyard in Piraeus Greece . Kyrenia II is often used as a floating ambassador of Cypriot culture, and has visited many parts of the world. In 1986, it visited New York City; in 1988, Japan; and in 1989, West Germany.

Kyrenia III
Following the 1988 visit to Japan, the Japanese National Television Organization  N.H.K under the project management of executive producer Yasuji Hamagami constructed the second full size replica of the ship of Kyrenia. The ship was named "KYRENIA-3" and is normally exhibited at the Nautical museum  of Fukuoka or Hakata.

Kyrenia Liberty
In 2002, the construction of a third replica of the ship began. The ship was named Kyrenia Liberty. It was built with respect for the original design but with modern techniques. The ship was ready for the 2004 Olympic Games and set sail for Athens, Greece with a symbolic cargo of copper to be used in the Olympic bronze medals. This cargo was symbolic since the name Cyprus is associated with the Latin word for "copper".

Symbolic meaning of the Kyrenia ships
The Kyrenia ship features on three of the Cypriot euro coins: the 10, 20, and 50 cents.

See also
Shipwreck
Ma'agan Michael Ship
Uluburun shipwreck

References

Further reading
 Casson, Lionel. Ships and Seafaring in Ancient Times. Austin, Texas. 109.
 Katzev, Susan Womer. “The Ancient Ship of Kyrenia, Beneath Cyprus Seas.” Great Moments in Greek Archaeology. Ed. Pavos Valavanis and David Hardy. Oxford University Press, 2007. 286-99.
 Steffy, Richard J. "The Kyrenia Ship: An Interim Report on its Hull Construction." American Journal of Archaeology 38.1 (January  1985): 71-101.
 Steffy, Richard J., 1993, "Ancient Ship Repair", in Harry Tzalas (ed.), Tropis V: 5th International Symposium on Ship Construction in Antiquity, Nauplia, 26, 27, 28 	August 1993: Proceedings, 395-408. Athens.

External links
 The Kyrenia Shipwreck Collection Restoration Program
 
 A (Greek-)Cypriot page about the Kyrenia ship
 The Central Bank of Cyprus - regarding the design of Cypriot euro coins
 Institute of Nautical Archaeology: No. 3/4 Fall/Winter 2002 for a tribute to Michael Katzev
 
 

Ancient Greek technology
Ancient shipwrecks
Archaeological discoveries in Cyprus
Archaeological discoveries in Europe
Archaeological sites in Cyprus
Ancient Cyprus
Merchant ships of Greece
Museums in Northern Cyprus
Replica ships
Ships of the Hellenistic period
Ships preserved in museums
Shipwrecks in the Mediterranean Sea
Transport in Cyprus
4th-century BC artefacts
1965 archaeological discoveries